Kulak is a village in the Tarsus district of Mersin Province, Turkey. At  in Çukurova (Cilicia of the antiquity) and to the south of Tarsus. It is situated to the north  of  Mediterranean Sea coast and west of  Berdan River. The population of Kulak was 918 as of 2011. Situated in the fertile plains,  farming is the major economic activity. Cotton and green house vegetables are the main crops. 

The frequent floods of Berdan River have reduced the agricultural income of the villagers. However, the State Hydraulic Works of Turkey has begun a project to control the river.

References

Villages in Tarsus District